Live in Mexico City may refer to:

Live in Mexico City (King Crimson album)
Meltdown: Live in Mexico City, King Crimson, 2018
Live in Mexico City (Bass Communion and Pig album)
Live in Mexico City, Dark Lunacy, 2012
Live in Mexico City, Lacrimosa (band), 2014